Ivan Skerlev (born 28 January 1986) is a Bulgarian footballer who plays as a defender. He plays mainly as a central defender, and can also play at right back.

References

External links

1986 births
Living people
Bulgarian footballers
First Professional Football League (Bulgaria) players
PFC Litex Lovech players
FC Dunav Ruse players
FC Lyubimets players
PFC Vidima-Rakovski Sevlievo players
FC Haskovo players
PFC Lokomotiv Mezdra players
SFC Etar Veliko Tarnovo players
Association football defenders
People from Haskovo
Sportspeople from Haskovo Province